The C32 class was a class of steam locomotives built for the New South Wales Government Railways of Australia.

History

Introduction
When the new Chief Commissioner, Edward Eddy, took office in 1888, he was anxious to have additional locomotives manufactured within the Colony, and the Government sought the formation of a manufacturing company in New South Wales by interested parties. When this failed, designs were prepared prior to inviting tenders in England.

Beyer, Peacock and Company was selected to build the new locomotives. The first batch of 50 locomotives were delivered between February 1892 and July 1893. They became known as the Manchester Engines.

At the request of the Railway Commissioners, the builders altered the last two engines of the first batch to operate as compounds, but these did not prove satisfactory and during 1901 were converted to 2-cylinders. The particular compound arrangement was never used in another locomotive, before or since.

Further orders over the 19 years saw 191 locomotives built the last being delivered in April 1911. The initial 50 were built with six wheel tenders, the remainder with eight wheel bogie tenders. Many of the originals were later equipped with bogie tenders, however a number of the class kept the shorter tenders to enable them to be turned on the  turntables at certain locations.

The final engine was built with a superheater, and tests showed a significant improvement in performance; as result the remaining 190 engines were similarly fitted as they became due for boiler renewal between 1914 and 1939.

The first passenger locomotives used on the Trans-Australian Railway the 26 strong Commonwealth Railways G class, were of similar design, and the class leader is preserved at the National Railway Museum, Port Adelaide.

Into service
When first introduced, the class was assigned to the Northern and Southern mail and express trains. Following the strengthening of the Wagga Wagga Viaduct in 1901, they worked the full length of the Main South line from Sydney to Albury, the express covering the 621 km in 12 hours and 35 minutes, including 14 stops.

With the arrival of even larger engines from 1909 to handle the important mail and express trains, the P class were redeployed to other passenger services. In November 1929 they were used on the inaugural Newcastle Flyers. They also began hauling the Caves Express to Mount Victoria and the South Coast Daylight Express to Bomaderry.

Apart from some very light country branch lines, the class worked throughout the state. They worked almost all South Coast line passenger services right up until the end of steam. They were equally at home on commuter services to Campbelltown or Richmond; on Newcastle suburban trains as far as Singleton and Dungog; on country branch line mixed or goods trains or even the Riverina Express from Narrandera to Griffith.

In the 1950s, it was found that the original low frames of the class were cracking causing most of the class to be reframed with higher frames.

Last years and demise
The first of the class to be withdrawn was 3264 following an accident at Otford in July 1956. Following the arrival of the 48 class diesels from 1959, withdrawals began in earnest. On 24 July 1971, the last regularly steam-hauled passenger train in New South Wales was hauled by 3246 from Newcastle to Singleton. In December 1971, 3229 (a shunting locomotive at Goulburn Depot) was the last of its class to be withdrawn.

Preservation

Gallery

See also
 NSWGR steam locomotive classification

References

4-6-0 locomotives
Baldwin locomotives
Beyer, Peacock locomotives
Clyde Engineering locomotives
Railway locomotives introduced in 1892
32
Standard gauge locomotives of Australia